The president of the Nigerian Senate is the presiding officer of the Senate of Nigeria, elected by its membership. The senate president is second in line of succession to the Nigerian presidency, after the Vice President of Nigeria. The current President of the Senate is Ahmad Lawan.

Selection and succession to presidency
The senate president is chosen in an indirect election conducted within the senate. The line of succession to the Nigerian presidency goes to the Vice President, and then the senate president should both the President and Vice President be unable to discharge the powers and duties of office.

List of Nigerian Senate Presidents

Trivia
 Nwafor Orizu was the only Senate President of Nigeria ever to ascend to the Nigerian presidency through the constitutional order of succession. He was later forced to handover power to Aguiyi-Ironsi military junta.
 Anyim Pius Anyim was the first Senate President born after independence, he was born on 19 February 1961.
 David Mark became the first person to retain the Presidency of the Senate and serve a second term in 2011. He and his deputy were re-nominated without contest.
 David Mark was the longest serving senate president (2007–2015) and his deputy, Ike Ekweremadu was the longest serving deputy senate president (2007–2019).
 Bukola Saraki was the first civilian former governor to become the president of the Senate.
 Bukola Saraki was the first Nigerian Senate President not to be born in Nigeria, he was born in London, United Kingdom.

References

 Official Website of the Nigerian Senate
 The Making of a Senate President

Government of Nigeria
Nigeria, Senate
President
Senate (Nigeria)